Kate Himrod Biggers (1849–1935) was an American suffragist. She served as president of the Oklahoma Woman's Suffrage Association.

Life
Biggers née Himrod was born on July 15, 1849 in Waterford, Pennsylvania. She married Thomas B. Biggers in 1874 and the couple moved west, living in Painterhood, Kansas, then the Chickasha, Indian Territory, finally settling in Marlow, Oklahoma in 1910.

Biggers joined the local suffrage association in Chickasha. In 1904 the Woman's Christian Temperance Union and the National American Woman Suffrage Association (NAWSA) helped form the Woman Suffrage Association of Oklahoma and Indian Territory. Biggers served as the group's first president from 1904 through 1911. The name was changed to the Oklahoma Woman's Suffrage Association in 1907 and was part of the NAWSA.

In 1910 Biggers ran unsuccessfully for the post of Oklahoma Commissioner of Charities and Corrections against the incumbent, Kate Barnard. In 1916 Biggers helped establish the Neighborly Home Demonstration Club of Stephens County. In 1918 she served as vice president of the Marlow Suffrage Club.

After the death of her husband, Biggers returned to Waterford, Pennsylvania where she died on August 27, 1935.

See also
 List of suffragists and suffragettes

References

1849 births
1935 deaths
American suffragists
Women in Oklahoma politics
People from Waterford, Pennsylvania
People from Chickasha, Oklahoma
People from Marlow, Oklahoma
Activists from Pennsylvania
Activists from Oklahoma
20th-century American politicians
20th-century American women politicians